Lumsden (Metz) Airport, formerly , was located  north-west of Lumsden, Saskatchewan, Canada.

See also 
List of airports in Saskatchewan
Lumsden (Colhoun) Airport
Disley Aerodrome
 List of defunct airports in Canada

References 

Defunct airports in Saskatchewan
Lumsden No. 189, Saskatchewan